is a Japanese footballer currently playing as a winger for Urawa Red Diamonds.

Career statistics

Club
.

Notes

Honours

Club
Urawa Red Diamonds
Japanese Super Cup: 2022

References

External links

1997 births
Living people
Japanese footballers
Association football midfielders
Toyo University alumni
J2 League players
Omiya Ardija players
Mito HollyHock players
Urawa Red Diamonds players
J1 League players